Natomas High School is a high school in the Natomas Unified School District located in the Natomas neighborhood of Sacramento. It is located at 3301 Fong Ranch Road.  The school mascot is Nelly the Nighthawk.

History
Opened in 1997, the school is the first high school built in the Natomas Unified School District. A total of 1,300 students started attending the school that year, although it was built to accommodate 1,800 and has a total capacity of 2,200. For the previous three years, high school students in the district attended classes on the campus of Leroy Greene Middle School.

In 1998, the school started a Business and Professions Academy. By 2001, eighty students in the program would regularly come to school in dresses, suits and ties or other clothing considered "business appropriate".

Notable alumni

 Daniel Cuevas – winger for Lobos de la BUAP in Ascenso MX and United States men's national under-20 soccer team
 Robert Rothbart – center for Hapoel Galil Elyon in the Israeli basketball league
 Teal Wicks – Actress. Performed on Broadway as Elphaba in Wicked.

Sports 
2008 Varsity Boys championship Soccer Team
Natomas Nighthawks (14-6-4), played Bella Vista (13-6-3) 2–1 in pouring rain to win the Sac-Joaquin Section Division III championship at Folsom High School. It was Nighthawks' first boys section soccer championship and the first time Coach Joe Rebelo's team advanced past the first round of the playoffs in his eight years at the school.

2020 Varsity Boys CIF NorCal Championship 
On March 7, 2020, The Natomas Nighthawks (19-6-3) beat John F. Kennedy High school of Richmond, CA (15-10-3) 3–2 to claim its first-ever CIF NorCal Division IV Soccer Championship.

 2020/21 Varsity GSL League Champions'''

On 4/16/21, the Natomas Nighthawks beat Florin High School to end with a league record of 4-0, and a 4-2 record overall, and claimed the title of the champions of the Greater Sacramento League for the first time in school history. Powered by Coach Hagan.

Notes

External links/sources

Official site

High schools in Sacramento, California
Educational institutions established in 1997
Public high schools in California
1997 establishments in California